Amy Hardcastle  (born 4 March 1989) is an English rugby league player who plays at  for Leeds Rhinos in the Betfred Women's Super League.

Born in Halifax, West Yorkshire, Hardcastle first played rugby league for Siddal before taking time away from the game after having her daughter. On her return Siddal had disbanded their women's team so Hardcastle joined Bradford Bulls. Over the next 10 years Hardcastle experienced considerable success as Bradford won the league title twice and the Challenge Cup once.

In 2020 Hardcastle left Bradford to join St Helens but did not make her first appearance for St Helens until 2021 as the 2020 season was cancelled due to the COVID-19 pandemic.  In her first full season with St Helens, Hardcastle scored 23 tries in just 13 appearances.

Hardcastle was first selected for the England national team in 2009 and played in both the 2013 and 2017 World Cup competitions.  Hardcastle has made 19 appearances for the national side, scoring 18 tries.

When the NRL named its women's team of the decade in 2020, Hardcastle was the only English player to feature in the team.

Away from rugby league, Hardcastle is a healthcare assistant in the accident & emergency department at the Royal Halifax Infirmary.

References

1989 births
Living people
Bradford Bulls players
England women's national rugby league team players
English female rugby league players
Leeds Rhinos Women players
Rugby league centres
Rugby league players from Halifax, West Yorkshire
St Helens Women RLFC players